Lancelot van Brederode (died 20 July 1573, Schoten) was a Dutch general in the Dutch Revolt. He was vice admiral of the 'geuzen' or 'Sea Beggars' and a captain in the army of Louis of Nassau.

He is not to be confused with another Lancelot van Brederode (c.1583–1668), associate of Frans Kuyper.

Life
An illegitimate son of Reinoud III van Brederode by Anna Simonsdochter, his year of birth is unknown. He led the resistance at the Siege of Haarlem but when the city fell the Spanish beheaded him and demolished the van Brederode castle. His half-brother Hendrick van Brederode was also a general in the revolt.

External links
 Lancelot van Brederode - 'Eén van de schoonste verzetsstrijders'

Dutch people of the Eighty Years' War (United Provinces)
1573 deaths